Acfred I (died 906) was the Count of Razès from 837 and Count of Carcassonne from 877.

Acfred was the younger son of Oliba I of Carcassonne. He inherited Razès on his father's death, while his elder brother Oliba II inherited Carcassonne. Acfred and Oliba probably shared authority with each other in their two counties until the elder's death in 877, when Acfred inherited both counties, probably as the regent for his nephew Bencion I, but actually as count in his own right. Bencion nevertheless succeeded him on his death.

Acfred married Adelinda, daughter of Bernard Plantapilosa and sister of William I of Aquitaine. He had three sons:
 William II of Aquitaine
 Acfred of Aquitaine
 Bernard III of Auvergne

References
 Lewis, Archibald R. The Development of Southern French and Catalan Society, 718–1050. University of Texas Press: Austin, 1965.

906 deaths
Counts of Carcassonne
Counts of Razès
9th-century people from West Francia
9th-century Visigothic people
Year of birth unknown